The Briar Patch Road Historic District is a historic district in East Hampton, New York that was listed on the National Register of Historic Places in 1988.  In 1988, it included seven contributing buildings.

It includes six houses:
Augustus Thomas House
Lawrence Aspinwall House
John Heywood Roudebush House
Shephard Krech House East, a Colonial Revival house designed by architect Arthur C. Jackson
H. H. Abbott's Servant Quarters
Howard Ogden Wood House

It is one of 8 historic districts and 24 individual properties covered in the Village of East Hampton Multiple Resource Area study of 1988.

References

Houses on the National Register of Historic Places in New York (state)
Shingle Style architecture in New York (state)
Colonial Revival architecture in New York (state)
Historic districts on the National Register of Historic Places in New York (state)
East Hampton (village), New York
Historic districts in Suffolk County, New York
National Register of Historic Places in Suffolk County, New York